The Tower is a Norwegian animated feature film directed by Mats Grorud. The film screened at the Cairo International Film Festival, Annecy International Animated Film Festival, Busan International Film Festival, Thessaloniki International Film Festival, Sevilla Film Festival and Rome Film Festival.

Plot
Wardi, an 11-year-old Palestinian girl, lives with her family in a Lebanese refugee camp. She learns about her family's history through stories told by three previous generations of refugees.

Production 
Mad solutions is the national distributors and Jour2fête is also a distributor of the film in France.

Awards

References

External links
 

2018 films
2010s Norwegian-language films
Norwegian animated films